Detlev Ploog  (29 November 1920 – 7 December 2005) was a German clinical psychiatrist, primate behavior researcher and anthropologist. He was a soldier in the Second World War, attained a doctorate in Heidelberg, was a director of Munich Max Planck Institute for Psychiatry and a professor at the University of Munich In addition he received the German Order of Merit (1980) and was a member of many years of a commission of the German Federal Ministry of the Interior.

German neuroscientists
German anthropologists
German psychiatrists
1920 births
2005 deaths
Officers Crosses of the Order of Merit of the Federal Republic of Germany
20th-century anthropologists